The Netherlands national water polo team represents the Netherlands in men's international water polo competitions and friendly matches. The team won bronze medals at the 1948 Summer Olympics and the 1976 Summer Olympics.

Results

Olympic Games

 1908 – 4th place
 1920 – 5th place
 1924 – 7th place
 1928 – 5th place
 1936 – 5th place
 1948 –  Bronze medal
 1952 – 5th place
 1960 – 8th place
 1964 – 8th place
 1968 – 7th place
 1972 – 7th place
 1976 –  Bronze medal
 1980 – 6th place
 1984 – 6th place
 1992 – 9th place
 1996 – 10th place
 2000 – 11th place

World Championship

 1973 – 8th place
 1975 – 7th place
 1978 – 13th place
 1982 – 4th place
 1986 – 14th place
 1994 – 8th place
 2001 – 9th place

FINA World Cup

 1983 – 6th place
 1985 – 6th place
 1995 – 7th place

FINA World League

 2003 – 6th place
 2011 – European Preliminary round
 2017 – European Preliminary round
 2018 – European Preliminary round

European Championship

 1927 – 11th place
 1934 – 9th place
 1938 –  Silver medal
 1947 – 5th place
 1950 –  Gold medal
 1954 – 4th place
 1958 – 6th place
 1962 – 6th place
 1966 – 8th place
 1970 – 5th place
 1974 – 4th place
 1977 – 5th place
 1981 – 8th place
 1983 – 6th place
 1985 – 7th place
 1989 – 8th place
 1991 – 9th place
 1993 – 8th place
 1995 – 10th place
 1997 – 9th place
 1999 – 12th place
 2001 – 10th place
 2003 – 11th place
 2006 – 10th place
 2012 – 10th place
 2016 – 12th place
 2018 – 10th place
 2020 – 15th place
 2022 – 11th place

Team

Current squad
Roster for the 2020 Men's European Water Polo Championship.

Head coach: Harry van der Meer

Past squads

 1908 Olympic Games – 4th place
Bouke Benenga, Johan Cortlever, Jan Hulswit, Eduard Meijer, Karel Meijer, Piet Ooms, and Johan Rühl.
 1960 Olympic Games – 8th place
Fred van Dorp, Henk Hermsen, Ben Kniest, Harry Lamme, Bram Leenards, Hans Muller, Harro Ran, Harry Vriend, and Fred van der Zwan.
 1964 Olympic Games – 8th place
Jan Bultman, Fred van Dorp, Henk Hermsen, Ben Kniest, Bram Leenards, Hans Muller, Wim van Spingelen, Nico van der Voet, Harry Vriend, Wim Vriend, and Gerrit Wormgoor.
 1968 Olympic Games – 7th place
Bart Bongers, Fred van Dorp, Loet Geutjes, André Hermsen, Hans Hoogveld, Evert Kroon, Ad Moolhuijzen, Hans Parrel, Nico van der Voet, Feike de Vries, and Hans Wouda.
 1972 Olympic Games – 7th place
Mart Bras, Ton Buunk, Wim Hermsen, Hans Hoogveld, Evert Kroon, Hans Parrel, Ton Schmidt, Wim van de Schilde, Gijze Stroboer, Jan Evert Veer, and Hans Wouda.
 1976 Olympic Games –  Bronze Medal
Alex Boegschoten, Ton Buunk, Andy Hoepelman, Evert Kroon, Nico Landeweerd, Hans Smits, Gijze Stroboer, Rik Toonen, Jan Evert Veer, Hans van Zeeland, and Piet de Zwarte.
 1980 Olympic Games – 6th place
Stan van Belkum, Wouly de Bie, Ton Buunk, Jan Jaap Korevaar, Nico Landeweerd, Aad van Mil, Ruud Misdorp, Dick Nieuwenhuizen, Eric Noordegraaf, Jan Evert Veer, and Hans van Zeeland.
 1984 Olympic Games – 6th place
Johan Aantjes, Stan van Belkum, Wouly de Bie, Ton Buunk, Ed van Es, Anton Heiden, Nico Landeweerd, Aad van Mil, Ruud Misdorp, Dick Nieuwenhuizen, Eric Noordegraaf, Roald van Noort, and Remco Pielstroom.
 1992 Olympic Games – 9th place
Bert Brinkman, Arie van de Bunt, Marc van Belkum, Robert Havekotte, Koos Issard, John Jansen, Gijs van der Leden, Harry van der Meer, Hans Nieuwenburg, Remco Pielstroom, John Scherrenburg, Jalo de Vries, and Jan Wagenaar.
 1996 Olympic Games – 10th place
Arie van de Bunt, Gert de Groot, Arno Havenga, Koos Issard, Bas de Jong, Niels van der Kolk, Marco Kunz, Harry van der Meer, Hans Nieuwenburg, Joeri Stoffels, Eelco Uri, Wim Vermeulen and Wyco de Vries. Head Coach: Hans van Zeeland.
 2000 Olympic Games – 11th place
Arie van de Bunt, Marco Booij, Bjørn Boom, Bobbie Brebde, Matthijs de Bruijn, Arno Havenga, Bas de Jong, Harry van der Meer, Gerben Silvis, Kimmo Thomas, Eelco Uri, Wim Vermeulen, and Niels Zuidweg. Head Coach: Johan Aantjes.
 2004 Olympic Qualifying Tournament – 5th place
Marco Booij, Bjørn Boom, Kjell Boom, Matthijs de Bruijn, Arno Havenga, Bas de Jong, Gijs de Kock, Tjerk Kramer, Marc Nolting, Mark Siewers, Gerben Silvis, Eelco Uri, Niels Zuidweg. Head Coach: Ron de Vogel.

See also
 Netherlands men's Olympic water polo team records and statistics
 Netherlands women's national water polo team

References

External links

Men's national water polo teams
 
Men's sport in the Netherlands